Copelatus mocquerysi is a species of diving beetle. It is part of the genus Copelatus, which is in the subfamily Copelatinae of the family Dytiscidae. It was described by Régimbart in 1895.

References

mocquerysi
Beetles described in 1895